Chitala is a genus of fish of the family Notopteridae. This genus contains six species, in which some are important in aquaculture and the aquarium industry. They are commonly known as the Asian knifefishes or featherbacks. They are native to freshwater in South and Southeast Asia.

Other well-known species are the clown knifefish (C. ornata) and the Indochina knifefish (C. blanci).

Species 
There are six recognized species in this genus. In the past some of these (notably C. ornata) were included in C. chitala, resulting in considerable confusion, especially in the fishing and aquarium industries.

 Chitala blanci (François d'Aubenton-Carafa, 1965) (Indochina featherback or royal knifefish)
 Chitala borneensis (Bleeker, 1851)
 Chitala chitala (F. Hamilton, 1822) (Indian featherback)
 Chitala hypselonotus (Bleeker, 1852) 
 †Chitala lopis (Bleeker, 1851) 
 Chitala ornata (J. E. Gray, 1831) (Clown featherback or clown knifefish)

References 

 
Notopteridae
Taxonomy articles created by Polbot